Arna bipunctapex  is a moth of the family Erebidae. It is found from India to Indochina and in Taiwan and Sundaland.

The larvae feed on Sepium, Terminalia, Shorea and Caerya species.

External links
Moths of Borneo

Lymantriinae
Moths described in 1891
Moths of Asia